In amateur radio and computing, a boat anchor or boatanchor is something obsolete, useless, and cumbersome – so-called because metaphorically its only productive use is to be thrown into the water as a boat mooring. Terms such as brick, doorstop, and paperweight are similar.

Amateur radio

In amateur radio, a boat anchor or boatanchor is an old piece of radio equipment. It is usually used in reference to large, heavy radio equipment of earlier decades that used tubes. In this context boat anchors are often prized by their owners and their strengths (e.g. immunity to EMP) emphasised, even if newer equipment is more capable.

An early use of the term appeared in a 1956 issue of CQ Amateur Radio Magazine. The magazine published a letter from a reader seeking "schematics or conversion data" for a war surplus Wireless Set No. 19 MK II transceiver in order to modify it for use on the amateur bands. The editor added this reply: 
The editor's use of the term generated some reader interest, and in February 1957, CQ published a follow-up story that included photos.

Computers
The metaphor transfers directly from old radios to old computers. It also has been extended to refer to relic software.

Hardware

Early computers were physically large and heavy devices. As computers became more compact, the term boat anchor became popular among users to signify that the earlier, larger computer gear was obsolete, no longer useful, or even damaged.

Software
The term boat anchor has been extended to software code that is left in a system's codebase, typically in case it is needed later. This is an example of an anti-pattern and therefore can cause many problems for people attempting to maintain the program that contains the obsolete code. The key problem comes from the fact that programmers will have a hard time differentiating between obsolete code which doesn't do anything and working code which does. For example, a programmer may be looking into a bug with the program's input handling system, so they search through the code looking for code that links into the input handling API. Obviously if the programmer comes across obsolete input handling code they may well start editing and debugging it, wasting valuable time before they realise that the code that they're working with is never executed and therefore not part of the problem they're trying to solve. Other problems include longer compile times and the risk that programmers may accidentally link working code into the defunct code, inadvertently resurrecting it. A recommended solution for dealing with boat anchors in source code is to remove them from the code base and to place them in a separate location so that they can be referred to if necessary, but will not be compiled or be mistaken as "working" code. (For example, deleting them, knowing they are stored in the project's source control)

See also
Anti-pattern
Vintage amateur radio
Legacy system

References

External links
Origin of Ham Speak
 BoatAnchor Manual Archive

Computer jargon
Amateur radio
Anti-patterns